This is a list of countries by quality of healthcare as published by the Organisation for Economic Co-operation and Development (OECD).

Outcome of cancer care

Major cancers
The 5-year observed survival rate refers to the percentage of patients who live at least five years after being diagnosed with cancer. Many of these patients live much longer than five years after diagnosis.

5-year survival rate is measured from the time of diagnosis, it is not the same as Life expectancy. More aggressive screening methods will cause 5-year survival rate to increase because people are diagnosed earlier, this does not mean they live longer. This phenomenon is called Lead-Time Bias. 

Rectal cancer 5-year survival rate

Lung cancer 5-year survival rate

Stomach cancer 5-year survival rate

Childhood (0-14) acute lymphoblastic leukaemia 5-year survival rate

Female specific cancers

Cervical cancer 5-year survival rate

Outcome of cardiovascular disease care

Hemorrhagic stroke 30 day in-hospital mortality per 100 hospital discharges

Ischemic stroke 30 day in-hospital mortality per 100 hospital discharges

See also
List of countries by hospital beds
List of countries by life expectancy*
World Health Organization ranking of health systems in 2000

References

External links
http://www.businessinsider.com/best-healthcare-systems-in-the-world-2012-6?op=1
Statista Data (2021)
World Population Review

Quality
International quality of life rankings